The Building at 210–212 West North Street was an apartment building located in Danville, Illinois. The two-story Queen Anne building was built in 1902. The building's front facade had four hexagonal window bays and an entrance between each pair of bays. Each entrance had a classical porch with Doric columns and an entablature. The window bays had a set of three windows on each story; the windows featured voussoirs and large keystones, and a stone belt course ran above the windows on each story. The roof had a large central pavilion with two dormers and two side pavilions with one each; the dormers were aligned with the four window bays.

The building was added to the National Register of Historic Places on November 8, 2000. It was demolished circa 2006, and was delisted in 2020.

References

Residential buildings on the National Register of Historic Places in Illinois
Apartment buildings in Illinois
Queen Anne architecture in Illinois
Residential buildings completed in 1902
Buildings and structures in Danville, Illinois
National Register of Historic Places in Vermilion County, Illinois
Former National Register of Historic Places in Illinois